Daniel Michael Wheeler (born December 10, 1977) is an American former professional baseball pitcher. He played in Major League Baseball for the Tampa Bay Devil Rays, New York Mets, Houston Astros, Boston Red Sox, and Cleveland Indians from 1999 through 2012.

Early career
Wheeler attended Pilgrim High School in Warwick, Rhode Island. He was drafted in the 1996 MLB draft by the Tampa Bay Devil Rays out of Central Arizona College. After the Devil Rays, he played for the New York Mets, who traded him to the Houston Astros for minor leaguer Adam Seuss in 2004.

Houston Astros

In 2005, Wheeler established himself as a top setup man for the Astros, going 2-3 with a 2.21 ERA in 71 games.

On October 19, 2005 during the National League Championship Series he recorded the last out at Busch Memorial Stadium in St. Louis, Missouri, a fly ball which was caught by Astro Jason Lane in right field off the bat of Yadier Molina. He played on Team USA in the 2006 World Baseball Classic in the offseason.

On April 9, 2007, Wheeler became the Astros' closer, replacing Brad Lidge.  However, Wheeler lost the closer's job when Lidge overcame injury and returned to the team.

Tampa Bay Rays

On July 28, 2007, Wheeler was traded back to the Tampa Bay Devil Rays in exchange for third baseman Ty Wigginton.

He is one of four pitchers who have pitched in at least 70 games each of the four seasons from 2004 to 08, the others being Scott Schoeneweis (who did so for five seasons), Bob Howry, and Chad Qualls.

Boston Red Sox
On December 17, 2010, the Boston Red Sox signed Wheeler to a one-year, $3 million contract with a club option for 2012.

Cleveland Indians
Wheeler was a non-roster invitee with the Cleveland Indians in 2012. He was added to the opening day roster on April 4, 2012. He struggled early, however, with an 8.76 ERA in 12 games. Wheeler was designated for assignment immediately following the game on May 13, 2012, against the Boston Red Sox in which he gave up six earned runs in one inning. After clearing waivers, Wheeler was outrighted to the triple-A Columbus Clippers on May 16, 2012. He appeared in 36 games for Columbus, posting a 3-3 record and a 2.32 ERA. On October 6, 2012, Wheeler elected free agency.

Kansas City Royals
On December 11, 2012, the Kansas City Royals confirmed they had signed Wheeler to a minor league contract with an expected invite to Major League spring training, but he would never appear in another major league game.

Wheeler retired in February 2014.

Personal life 
Wheeler is married to Stephanie, who is the daughter of long time Rays play-by-play broadcaster Dewayne Staats.

References

External links

, or Retrosheet

1977 births
Living people
Baseball players at the 1999 Pan American Games
Boston Red Sox players
Central Arizona Vaqueros baseball players
Charleston RiverDogs players
Cleveland Indians players
Columbus Clippers players
Durham Bulls players
Houston Astros players
Hudson Valley Renegades players
Major League Baseball pitchers
New York Mets players
Norfolk Tides players
Omaha Storm Chasers players
Orlando Rays players
Pan American Games medalists in baseball
Pan American Games silver medalists for the United States
Pawtucket Red Sox players
Richmond Braves players
Baseball players from Providence, Rhode Island
Tampa Bay Devil Rays players
Tampa Bay Rays players
Tiburones de La Guaira players
American expatriate baseball players in Venezuela
World Baseball Classic players of the United States
2006 World Baseball Classic players
Medalists at the 1999 Pan American Games